is a Japanese politician of the Liberal Democratic Party, a member of the House of Representatives in the Diet (national legislature).  He represents the 4th District of Okayama prefecture.

Member of a political dynasty
A native of Sōja, Okayama, Gaku Hashimoto is the son of a former Prime Minister of Japan, Ryutaro Hashimoto, and the grandson of Ryugo Hashimoto, also a member of the House of Representatives.

His uncle Daijiro Hashimoto is a former governor of Kōchi Prefecture. His mother Kumiko Nakamura belongs to another dynasty, the Nakamura family.

His great-grandfather Utaro Hashimoto headed the quasi-monopolistic Dai-Nippon Beer Company, Ltd., which is now Sapporo Brewery.

Career
Hashimoto attended the Keio University as both undergraduate and graduate, and joined the Mitsubishi Research Institute.

In 2005, Hashimoto was elected to the House of Representatives for the first time. He also served as Member, Special Committee on Okinawa and Northern Problems, Director, Special Committee on Anti-Piracy Measures, Prevention of International Terrorism, and Japan's Cooperation and Support, Director, Committee on Internal Affairs and Communications.

Ideology
Hashimoto is affiliated to the openly revisionist lobby Nippon Kaigi, and a member of the following right-wing groups in the Diet:
Nippon Kaigi Diet discussion group (日本会議国会議員懇談会 - Nippon kaigi kokkai giin kondankai)
Conference of parliamentarians on the Shinto Association of Spiritual Leadership (神道政治連盟国会議員懇談会 - Shinto Seiji Renmei Kokkai Giin Kondankai) - NB: SAS a.k.a. Sinseiren, Shinto Political League
83 Group (83会)

Hashimoto gave the following answers to the questionnaire submitted by Mainichi to parliamentarians:

In 2012:
in favor of the revision of the Constitution
in favor of the right of collective self-defense (revision of Article 9)
against the reform of the National assembly (unicameral instead of bicameral)
in favor of reactivating nuclear power plants
against the goal of zero nuclear power by 2030s
in favor of the relocation of Marine Corps Air Station Futenma (Okinawa)
against evaluating the purchase of Senkaku Islands by the Government
in favor of a strong attitude versus China
no answer regarding the participation of Japan to the Trans-Pacific Partnership
in favor of considering a nuclear-armed Japan in the future
against the reform of the Imperial Household that would allow women to retain their Imperial status even after marriage
In 2014:
in favor of the revision of the Article 9 of the Japanese Constitution
in favor of the right of collective self-defense
in favor of nuclear plants
no problem for visits of a Prime Minister to the controversial Yasukuni Shrine
in favor of the revision of the Murayama Statement
against the revision of the Kono Statement
against laws preventing hate speech
considers that Marine Corps Air Station Futenma is a burden for Okinawa
in favor of the Special Secrecy Law
against teaching 'morality' in school

References

External links 
  in Japanese.
 Twitter

1974 births
Living people
People from Okayama Prefecture
Keio University alumni
Children of prime ministers of Japan
Koizumi Children
Members of Nippon Kaigi
Members of the House of Representatives (Japan)
Liberal Democratic Party (Japan) politicians